Two male athletes from Honduras competed at the 1996 Summer Paralympics in Atlanta, United States.

See also
Honduras at the Paralympics
Honduras at the 1996 Summer Olympics

References 

Nations at the 1996 Summer Paralympics
1996
Summer Paralympics